Welcome to Earth is the third studio album by Norwegian futurepop band Apoptygma Berzerk. It was released on February 22, 2000 on Metropolis Records but was earlier released on Tatra Records.

The general themes of the album are those of extraterrestrials contacting Earth and of moving on. The songs themselves contain samples of reports of alien sightings, and crop circle designs feature prominently in the cover and liner notes. Several tracks have been staples in live concerts ever since, especially the single "Kathy's Song", which became one of the band's biggest hits, being remixed by high-profile artists such as VNV Nation and Ferry Corsten.

Themes
The album deals mainly with the modern mythology of extraterrestrial aliens and a hope that one day the truth will be revealed to us. Generally the tracks convey a feeling of alienation as well.

Stylistically, the album drew criticism upon its release for incorporating elements of vocal trance music on tracks such as "Eclipse" and "Kathy's Song", and overall being geared towards being a pop album. There are some tributes to the Commodore 64 home computer as well, hidden in the "64k" track which is based heavily on a sample of Chris Hülsbeck's Commodore 64 version of "Axel F", and the track Untitled 4 is essentially a Commodore 64 chiptune.

The track "Moment of Tranquility" is a reimagined version of "Falling", the theme song to the television series Twin Peaks, with new lyrics. The beginning of the song contains a sample of dialogue from a Season 2 episode.

Track listing

2007 remastered release

Charts

The single "Eclipse" ranked #41 on the German Alternative Charts (DAC) 1999 Top 50 Singles chart. "Kathy's Song" peaked at #16 on the CMJ RPM Charts in the U.S.

References

2000 albums
Apoptygma Berzerk albums